The University of Management and Technology (UMT) (Urdu: یونیورسٹی آف مینیجمنٹ اینڈ ٹکنالوجی) is a private-sector university located in Lahore, Pakistan. UMT is a project of ILM Trust. It is an independent, not-for-profit private organization. UMT Sialkot Campus was formally opened in Sialkot on May 2, 2012. UMT has the distinction of being the 1st university in Sialkot.

Education in Sialkot